Vivian "Vince" McKeating (birth registered fourth ¼ 1919 – 2011) was an English professional rugby league footballer who played in the 1940s and 1950s.

Background
Vince McKeating's birth was registered in Cockermouth district, Cumberland, England, and he died aged 91–92.

Playing career

International honours
Vince McKeating represented British Empire while at Workington in 1949 against France, and won caps for England while at Workington in 1951 against Wales, and France, and won caps for Great Britain while at Workington in 1951 against New Zealand (2 matches).

County honours
Vince McKeating represented Cumberland. Vince McKeating played  in Cumberland's 5-4 victory over Australia in the 1948–49 Kangaroo tour of Great Britain and France match at the Recreation Ground, Whitehaven on Wednesday 13 October 1948, in front of a crowd of 8,818.

Championship final appearances
Vince McKeating played  in Dewsbury's 4-13 defeat by Wigan in the Championship Final during the  1946–47 season at Maine Road, Manchester on Saturday 21 June 1947.

Challenge Cup Final appearances
Vince McKeating played  in Workington Town's 18-10 victory over Featherstone Rovers in the 1952 Challenge Cup Final during the 1951–52 season at Wembley Stadium, London on Saturday 19 April 1952, in front of a crowd of 72,093, and played  in Barrow's 21-12 victory over Workington Town in the 1955 Challenge Cup Final during the 1954–55 season at Wembley Stadium, London on Saturday 30 April 1955, in front of a crowd of 66,513.

County Cup Final appearances
Vince McKeating played  in Barrow's 12-2 victory over Oldham in the 1954 Lancashire County Cup Final during the 1954–55 season at Station Road, Swinton on Saturday 23 October 1954.

Career records
Vince McKeating holds Workington Town's "Consecutive Appearances" record, with 141-appearances from August 1948 to September 1951.

Genealogical information
Vince McKeating was the younger brother of the rugby league footballer, Dan McKeating. Vince McKeating's marriage to Elsie (née Wilson) was registered during second ¼ 1944 in Barrow-in-Furness district.

References

External links
(archived by web.archive.org) Back on the Wembley trail

1919 births
2011 deaths
Barrow Raiders players
British Empire rugby league team players
Cumberland rugby league team players
Dewsbury Rams players
England national rugby league team players
English rugby league players
Great Britain national rugby league team players
Place of death missing
Rugby league players from Cockermouth
Rugby league hookers
Workington Town players